Rosalie "Rosie" Hamlin (July 21, 1945 – March 30, 2017) was an American singer and songwriter who was the frontwoman of the group Rosie and the Originals, best known for the 1960 song "Angel Baby", which became a Top 40 hit in 1961 when Hamlin was only 15 years old. She married guitarist, Noah Tafolla, and they had two children (Joseph and Deborah) before they divorced. Hamlin had a third child (John) several years later. Hamlin continued to perform including performing at several revival concerts until 2002, before retiring from live performances due to advanced fibromyalgia.

Hamlin's "Angel Baby" was covered by several artists, including Linda Ronstadt and John Lennon, who cited Hamlin as one of his favorite singers. She was the first Latina to be honored by the Rock and Roll Hall of Fame, as well as the first Latina to appear on Dick Clark's American Bandstand in 1961.

Early life
Rosalie "Rosie" Méndez Hamlin was born in Klamath Falls, Oregon, on July 21, 1945, to Ofelia Juana Méndez and Harry Hamlin (not to be confused with the actor of the same name).  Her mother was Mexican, and her father was of Anglo-American ancestry. She spent part of her childhood between Anchorage, Alaska and California, before her family moved to National City, California. Hamlin came from a musical family; her father and grandfather were both musicians who had backgrounds in vaudeville.

Hamlin began singing with a band at 13. She wrote the lyrics for "Angel Baby" as a poem for "[her] very first boyfriend" when she was 14 years old, still attending Mission Bay High School in San Diego, California. During her childhood, Hamlin was trained to play piano.

Career
At age fifteen, Hamlin and some friends rented the only recording studio they could find within 100 miles of San Diego located in San Marcos, California, to record the song. The studio was owned by an airplane mechanic who had taken part of his hangar to make it. After taking the master to a Kresge's department store in downtown San Diego, they convinced a manager to play it in the listening booth of the store's music department. The song received positive reactions from teenage listeners, and a scout from Highland Records offered the group a recording contract, under the condition that the company take possession of the master recording, and that David Ponce be named as the author of the song, as he was the eldest member of the group. Hamlin along with her band performed six shows with Jackie Wilson at the Brooklyn Paramount Theatre in New York City in late 1960.

"Angel Baby", which featured Hamlin's noted soprano vocals, made its radio debut in November 1960, before the group had even received their contract; the track was also played on K-Day Radio from disc jockey Alan Freed. When the group formally established a contract, Hamlin found that she was ineligible to collect record royalties from the song because she was not listed as the songwriter. This led to the group's break-up, and although Hamlin secured the copyright to her music in 1961, decades of battles over royalties followed. "Angel Baby" charted at number 5 on the Billboard Singles Chart. On March 30, 1961, Hamlin appeared with Rosie and the Originals on Dick Clark's American Bandstand, performing "Lonely Blue Nights", making her the first Latina to appear on the series.

In 2001, Hamlin released Angel Baby Revisited, which features original recordings and other performances, as well as a Spanglish version of "Angel Baby," which featured lyrics that alternate between English and Spanish. She would perform revival shows in 2002, including performances at Madison Square Garden, before formally retiring from performing due to advanced fibromyalgia.

Personal life
Hamlin formally retired from the music industry in 1963 after her marriage to Originals guitarist Noah Tafolla. The couple had two children, Joey and Deborah ( 1964).

Death
Hamlin died in her sleep of undisclosed causes on March 30, 2017 at her home in New Mexico. Her family confirmed she had suffered health problems in the course of her later life which prevented her from performing live.

Legacy
Hamlin's track "Angel Baby" was cited by John Lennon as one of his favorite songs, and he covered the track in 1975. She was the first Latina to be honored by the Rock and Roll Hall of Fame, on their Wall of One-Hit Wonders. In July 2007, a concert honoring Hamlin was held at the Pearson Park Amphitheater in Anaheim, California.

References

External links

1945 births
2017 deaths
American child singers
American contraltos
American musicians of Mexican descent
American people of English descent
Hispanic and Latino American women singers
Hispanic and Latino American musicians
Musicians from Anchorage, Alaska
People from Klamath Falls, Oregon
Singers from Alaska
Singers from California
Singers from Oregon
Songwriters from Oregon
Child pop musicians
Doo-wop musicians
Torch singers
21st-century American women